Sphingomonas formosensis  is a Gram-negative and short rod-shaped bacteria from the genus of Sphingomonas which has been isolated from agricultural soil in Kaohsiung County in Taiwan. Sphingomonas formosensis has the ability to degrade polycyclic aromatic hydrocarbon compounds.

References

Further reading

External links

 Type strain of Sphingomonas formosensis at BacDive -  the Bacterial Diversity Metadatabase

formosensis
Bacteria described in 2012